Joy Behar: Say Anything! was an American news program and talk show hosted by Joy Behar. The program had its "Preview" while Behar filled in as a week-long host on Viewpoint with Eliot Spitzer on June 18, 2012, and officially premiered on Current TV on September 4, 2012. The final episode of the Current TV program aired on August 1, 2013, as the network prepared to transition to Al Jazeera America.

HLN version (2009–11)
The Joy Behar Show was a news program and talk show that premiered on HLN on Tuesday, September 29, 2009 and ran until December 16, 2011. The show was hosted by Joy Behar, who is one of the five co-hosts of The View.

The show originally aired in the 9PM eastern slot/8PM central with encore presentations at 12AM and 5AM eastern, but was moved to 10PM eastern in January 2011 with encore presentations at 3AM eastern. The show aired new episodes Monday through Friday, while the shows on Saturday and Sunday were reruns.

The show's format was generally an interview/discussion setting where Joy Behar and her panel of guests discussed current events in pop culture, politics, and general media happenings. Guests were also often interviewed one on one, or by satellite feed, where questions are more geared toward that particular guest's life and views.

The show was cancelled on November 17, 2011 and Joy Behar stated that she appreciated all of the people who helped put the show together. The final episode aired on Friday, December 16, 2011.

HLN guests
Some guests who appeared on the HLN show include: Kate Gosselin, Jeff Ross,  Joan Rivers, Kathy Griffin, Bette Midler, Christopher Hitchens, Ann Coulter, Michael Moore, Jeanine Pirro, Sarah Silverman, Bill Murray, Jane Curtin, Gilbert Gottfried, Betty White, Roseanne Barr, Dolly Parton, Linda Evangelista, The Go Go's, Wendy Malick, Rita Moreno, Victor Garber, Gloria Estefan, Rosie O'Donnell, Steve Martin, Perez Hilton, Linda Gray, Susie Essman, Carrie Fisher, Arianna Huffington, Martin Short and Valerie Bertinelli. Her View Co-hosts Whoopi Goldberg, Sherri Shepherd, Elisabeth Hasselbeck, and former co-Host Star Jones, also appeared.

HLN Ratings
During its HLN run, The Joy Behar Show was not successful in comparison to other cable news shows of its format. A ratings snapshot taken February 11, 2010 revealed Behar as the fourth highest rated show in its timeslot, well over two million viewers behind Sean Hannity.

Move to Current TV (2012–13)
On June 11, 2012, Behar signed a deal with Current TV to do a similar show, now shortened to just Joy Behar, but with a more political slant. Although the series debuted in September 2012, she unveiled her new series logo during her fill-in as host for Viewpoint with Eliot Spitzer on June 18, 2012.

On July 31, 2012, Current TV announced that the program would debut on September 4, 2012 and would be titled Joy Behar: Say Anything!.

Joy Behar: Say Anything! premiered on Current TV on Tuesday September 4, 2012 at 6:00e/3:00p with guests Darrell Hammond, Al Gore, Judy Gold and Rob Shuter. The show aired from Monday to Thursday at 9:00/8:00c.

Episodes

Awards and nominations
GLAAD Awards
2010 – Nomination for Best Talk Show Episode (LDS Church & Gays)

References

External links
 
 

CNN Headline News original programming
Current TV original programming
2000s American television talk shows
2009 American television series debuts
2010s American television talk shows
2011 American television series endings
2012 American television series debuts
2013 American television series endings
American television series revived after cancellation